The 1996 MAAC men's basketball tournament was held March 2–4, 1996 at Knickerbocker Arena in Albany, New York.

Fifth-seeded  defeated  in the championship game, 52–46, to win their first MAAC men's basketball tournament.

The Golden Griffins received an automatic bid to the 1996 NCAA tournament.

Format
All eight of the conference's members participated in the tournament field. They were seeded based on regular season conference records.

Bracket

References

MAAC men's basketball tournament